The Asia/Oceania Zone was one of the three zones of the regional Davis Cup competition in 1999.

In the Asia/Oceania Zone there were four different tiers, called groups, in which teams competed against each other to advance to the upper tier. Winners in Group I advanced to the World Group Qualifying Round, along with losing teams from the World Group first round. Teams who lost their respective ties competed in the relegation play-offs, with winning teams remaining in Group I, whereas teams who lost their play-offs were relegated to the Asia/Oceania Zone Group II in 2000.

Participating nations

Draw

 relegated to Group II in 2000.
 and  advance to World Group Qualifying Round.

First round

South Korea vs. India

China vs. New Zealand

Uzbekistan vs. Pakistan

Lebanon vs. Japan

Second round

New Zealand vs. South Korea

Japan vs. Uzbekistan

First round relegation play-offs

India vs. China

Lebanon vs. Pakistan

Second round relegation play-offs

China vs. Pakistan

References

External links
Davis Cup official website

Davis Cup Asia/Oceania Zone
Asia Oceania Zone Group I